Mattig's formula was an important formula in observational cosmology and extragalactic astronomy which gives relation between radial coordinate and redshift of a given source. It depends on the cosmological model being used and is used to calculate luminosity distance in terms of redshift.

It assumes zero dark energy, and is therefore no longer applicable in modern cosmological models such as the Lambda-CDM model, (which require a numerical integration to get the distance-redshift relation).  However, Mattig's formula was of considerable historical importance as the first analytic formula for the distance-redshift relationship for arbitrary matter density, and this spurred significant research in the 1960s and 1970s attempting to measure this relation.

Without dark energy
Derived by W. Mattig in a 1958 paper, the mathematical formulation of the relation is,

  is the deceleration parameter while  is the density of matter in the universe at present.
  is scale factor at present time while  is scale factor at any other time.
  is Hubble's constant at present and
  is as usual the redshift.

This equation is only valid if . When  the value of  cannot be calculated. That follows from the fact that the derivation assumes no cosmological constant and, with no cosmological constant,  is never negative.

From the radial coordinate we can calculate luminosity distance using the following formula,

 

When  we get another expression for luminosity distance using Taylor expansion,

 

But in 1977 Terrell devised a formula which is valid for all ,

References

Observational cosmology